The Jimi River is a river in Jiwaka Province, Papua New Guinea.

See also
List of rivers of Papua New Guinea
 Jimi languages
 Jimi Valley
 Jimi District
 Jimi Rural LLG

References

Rivers of Papua New Guinea